Prata is a village in Tuscany, central Italy, administratively a frazione of the comune of Suvereto, province of Livorno. At the time of the 2011 census its population was 66.

Prata is about 72 km from Livorno and 4 km from Suvereto.

External links 
 

Frazioni of Suvereto